Néstor Martín-Fernández de la Torre, generally known simply as Néstor (4 May 1887, Las Palmas - 6 February 1938, Las Palmas) was a Canarian painter and theatrical designer who worked in the Symbolist and Art Deco styles.

Biography 

He began his artistic development at the age of seven, when he attended the "Colegio San Agustín" and was given drawing lessons by Nicolás Massieu (1876-1954), who would later become a well-known painter. In 1899, he received his first formal art instruction from the peripatetic Spanish landscape painter Eliseu Meifrèn.

When still only fifteen, he received a grant from the city of Las Palmas to study in Madrid, but the entrance exams for the Academia were too difficult, so he taught himself by making copies in the Museo del Prado. He then travelled extensively, visiting París, Brussels and London, among other places, to perfect his technique. While in Paris, he also designed theater sets and clothing.

He established a studio in Barcelona in 1907 and his first exhibition came in 1908, at the "Círculo Ecuestre", a sporting and social club, where he displayed a series of portraits, influenced by his stay in England. The following year, he presented four decorative panels at the Sala Parés, which he had designed for the dance hall in Tibidabo, inspired by the poems of Jacinto Verdaguer.

He continued to exhibit widely, in Paris and London, as well as Madrid. In 1915, he had his solo début as a theatrical designer, creating sets and costumes for a production of El amor brujo by Manuel de Falla in Madrid. He moved his studios to Paris in 1928 and did more designing for ballets, operas and other productions, including costumes for Cécile Sorel, Grace Moore and Conchita Supervía.

After more travelling, including excursions through the Spanish colonies in Africa, he returned to Las Palmas and established a studio there in 1934. In addition to his paintings, he decorated the "Casino de Tenerife" in Santa Cruz and the "Teatro Pérez Galdós" in Las Palmas and initiated a campaign to promote tourism, which he called "Tipismo" (picturesqueness). He died suddenly, from complications related to pneumonia, leaving several major projects unfinished.

In 1956, the "Museo Néstor" was inaugurated in the city centre of Las Palmas. It is located in the "Pueblo Canario", a cultural complex designed by his brother, an architect. The complex includes decorations by Néstor and contains the majority of his works.

References

Further reading
 Saro Alemán Hernández, El pintor Néstor Martín Fernández de la Torre : (1887-1938), Cabildo Insular de Gran Canaria (1991)  
 Pedro Almeida Cabrera, Néstor : Néstor Martín Fernández de la Torre Gobierno de Canarias, Viceconsejería de Cultura y Deportes (1991) 
 Néstor: un canario cosmopolita (1887-1938) Biography  by Pedro Almeida Cabrera (digitalized by the "Memoria digital de Canarias" (mdC) at the Universidad de Las Palmas de Gran Canaria).

External links 

 Museo Néstor homepage.
 Interview with Daniel Montesdeoca, Director of the Museo Néstor on Croma Cultura.
 Biography by Daniel Montesdeoca García-Sáenz @ the Teatro Pérez Galdós website, including a selection of photographs.

1887 births
1938 deaths
People from Las Palmas
Set designers
Spanish costume designers
Artists from the Canary Islands
20th-century Spanish painters
20th-century Spanish male artists
Spanish male painters